Lake Charles LNG (former name: Trunkline LNG) is a liquefied natural gas import terminal in Lake Charles, Louisiana, United States.  It is owned by the subsidiary of Energy Transfer Equity. Together with Royal Dutch Shell there is a plan to build a 15 million tons per year liquefaction plant to the terminal to allow LNG export. However, the investment decision is delayed.

The Phase II expansion also included the construction of unloading capabilities at the terminal's second dock.

References

External links
 

Liquefied natural gas terminals
Buildings and structures in Lake Charles, Louisiana
Natural gas infrastructure in the United States